Amian Clement (born 16 August 1992) is an Ivorian football player.

Club career
He made his professional debut in the Segunda Liga for Sporting Covilhã on 13 February 2011 in a game against Estoril.

References

External links

1992 births
Footballers from Abidjan
Living people
Ivorian footballers
Ivorian expatriate footballers
Liga Portugal 2 players
S.C. Covilhã players
Anadia F.C. players
Lusitano FCV players
A.D. Nogueirense players
S.C. Praiense players
F.C. Vizela players
Varzim S.C. players
Association football defenders
Expatriate footballers in Portugal
Ivorian expatriate sportspeople in Portugal